The CONCACAF Gold Cup is North America's major tournament in senior men's football and determines the continental champion. Until 1989, the tournament was known as CONCACAF Championship. It is currently held every two years. From 1996 to 2005, nations from other confederations have regularly joined the tournament as invitees. In earlier editions, the continental championship was held in different countries, but since the inception of the Gold Cup in 1991, the United States are constant hosts or co-hosts.

From 1973 to 1989, the tournament doubled as the confederation's World Cup qualification. CONCACAF's representative team at the FIFA Confederations Cup was decided by a play-off between the winners of the last two tournament editions in 2015 via the CONCACAF Cup, but was then discontinued along with the Confederations Cup.

Since the inaugural tournament in 1963, the Gold Cup was held 26 times and has been won by seven different nations, most often by Mexico (11 titles).

Although Panama was one of the nine teams which participated in the inaugural 1963 CONCACAF Championship, it took 30 years for them to make a second appearance on a continental tournament. However, they have continually participated since 2005 and reached the knockout stages every time, even playing two finals. They lost both of them to the United States on penalties in 2005 and 0–1 in 2013.

In 2015, Panama finished third in the tournament, drawing all six matches 1–1 after normal time.

Overall record

Match overview

Record players

Panama's record cap holder Gabriel Gómez appeared in seven consecutive CONCACAF Gold Cups. After the 2018 FIFA World Cup however, he officially retired from international football.

He and goalkeeper Jaime Penedo are the only players who were fielded in both of Panama's Gold Cup finals (2005 and 2013).

Top goalscorers
Blas Pérez scored at least once at each of his five tournament participations. In 2013, Gabriel Torres became the first and only Panamanian to win the Golden Boot at a continental championship.

Awards and records

Team awards
 Runners-up: 2005, 2013
 Third place: 2011, 2015
 Fair play award: 2013

Individual awards
 MVP 2005: Luis Tejada
 Golden Boot 2013: Gabriel Torres (5 goals, shared)
 Golden Glove 2005: Jaime Penedo
 Golden Glove 2013: Jaime Penedo

References

External links
RSSSF archives and results
Soccerway database

Countries at the CONCACAF Gold Cup
Panama national football team